NI Ultiboard or formerly ULTIboard is an electronic Printed Circuit Board Layout program which is part of a suite of circuit design programs, along with NI Multisim. One of its major features is the Real Time Design Rule Check, a feature that was only offered on expensive work stations in the days when it was introduced. ULTIboard was originally created by a company named Ultimate Technology, which is now a subsidiary of National Instruments. Ultiboard includes a 3D PCB viewing mode, as well as integrated import and export features to the Schematic Capture and Simulation software in the suite, Multisim.

History

Market Penetration
ULTIboard was originally created by Ultimate Technology in Naarden, Netherlands.
ULTIboard was sold for $800–$2500, depending on the design size required.

Student versions that were offered for very low prices were limited; they could not produce photo plot files. They also contributed to the popularity of the software as most students knew how to work with the program.

Ultimate Technology's Managing Director, James Post, was known for his innovative marketing approach and customer oriented thinking. In 1989 they distributed 180,000 demo-discs via electronics magazines, a first in history. Soon thereafter, ULTIboard became marketing leader in Europe in the field of PC based PCB design products.

The company held worldwide User Meetings where customers could attend free and even got a free gourmet lunch. Optionally, customers could take an afternoon training to get up and running with the latest features. Priced at US$75, most users took this option. Other PR activities included invitations for customers to have a lunch during trade shows and conferences, boat rides, cart racing, flying for their best accounts. This strategy helped ULTIboard to become the leader in customer loyalty.

Rebranding
Ultimate Technology merged with Interactive Image Technologies in 1999 and eventually renamed itself to Electronics Workbench. In 2003 all development of ULTIboard was moved to the head office in Toronto.

Ultiboard is now supported and distributed by National Instruments.  The product has been renamed from Electronics Workbench back to Ultiboard with the schematic capture and simulation tool named Multisim.

See also

 Comparison of EDA software
 List of free electronics circuit simulators
 NI Multisim, the schematic capture and simulation software that is integrated with Ultiboard.
 OrCAD, a competitor to Ultiboard.

External links
 
 NI Ultiboard product page
 Getting Started with NI Ultiboard

Electronic design automation software